God's Little Acre is a 1958 American comedy-drama film of Erskine Caldwell's 1933 novel of the same name. It was directed by Anthony Mann and shot in black and white by cinematographer Ernest Haller. Although the film was not released until August 1958, its production schedule is indicated as September 11 to late October 1957.

The film was as controversial as the novel, although unlike its source material it was not subjected to prosecution for obscenity. Although both the book and film were laced throughout with racy innuendo calling into question the issue of marital fidelity, the film adaptation may have been the more alarming because it portrayed a popular uprising, or workers' insurrection, in the Southern United States by laid-off millworkers trying to gain control of the factory equipment on which their jobs depended. When the film was first released, audiences under 18 years of age were prohibited from viewing what were perceived to be numerous sexy scenes throughout, although in recent decades the film's scandalous reputation has diminished.

Philip Yordan was officially given credit for the screenplay, but Ben Maddow claimed he wrote it. Since Maddow was blacklisted for his radical, and suspected but unproven Communist, activities during the 1950s Red Scare, working without credit was the only way he could successfully submit screenplays. After decades of neglect, the film was restored by the UCLA Film and Television Archive under the supervision of master restorer Robert Gitt. As part of Gitt's restoration, Yordan's name was removed and replaced by Maddow's in the main titles, although it does not appear on most current releases.

Plot
Widower Ty Ty Walden and his two daughters, Rosamund and Darlin' Jill, live in the backwoods of Georgia during the Great Depression. He also has three sons: Jim, Shaw, and Buck.

While Ty Ty searches constantly for gold on his farm, his son-in-law Will cheats on his wife Rosamund with Buck's wife, Griselda. Ty Ty has been digging for gold on his land for 15 years, searching for the treasure his grandfather left him. Consequently, the farm has suffered from many years' neglect.

Pluto Swint arrives to announce he's running for sheriff. Swint is invited to come around back where Darlin' Jill is taking a bath in an outdoor bathtub positioned near a handpump and spigot. She asks him to pump some more water, and although Swint is asked to keep his eyes closed, he sneaks a peek.

In the belief that having an albino with him in his quest for treasure will bring him great fortune, Ty Ty transports and wrongfully imprisons Dave Dawson, demanding that he help him locate the buried treasure.  Dawson, using a divining rod, claims the gold lies on the neighboring church's land (referred to as "God's Little Acre"). Ty Ty pulls the marker out of the ground, explaining that God told him to move it, thereby absolving him from giving any gold found in this new spot to the church.

In the middle of the night Will leaves his house, followed by Griselda. He breaks open the mill's gates and enters the property. At first, she distracts him from his purpose, and they kiss. He then escorts her back to the gates and asks the growing crowd to restrain her. He re-enters and turns on the power, and the machines reactivate to the cheers of the crowd.

Hearing the rioters' assembly and the mill's power turned on, the caretaker comes from an inside office and shoots Will for trespassing. The crowd carries his body back to his house. Griselda enters to tell Rosamund the bad news, but Rosamund cries out that she already knows what has happened.

The populist Pluto Swint is elected sheriff, replacing the incumbent. The Walden family squabbles after Will's funeral, particularly over Griselda's actions at the mill and the numerous affections which she attracts from the other sons. The family decides to give up searching for the gold.

The family contentedly plow for the first time in years, with Ty Ty finding the blade of an old shovel in the ground and speculates about whether the gold might lie in that spot. As he begins digging again, the final resting place of the marker for God's Little Acre is revealed to be none other than the pond.

Cast

 Robert Ryan as Ty Ty Walden, a widower
 Aldo Ray as Will Thompson
 Buddy Hackett as Pluto Swint
 Jack Lord as Buck Walden
 Fay Spain as Darlin' Jill Walden, Ty Ty's daughter
 Vic Morrow as Shaw Walden

 Helen Westcott as Rosamund, Will's wife
 Lance Fuller as Jim Leslie
 Rex Ingram as Uncle Felix
 Michael Landon as Dave Dawson, the albino

 Russell Collins as watchman
 Davis Roberts as farm worker with hoe
 Janet Brandt [also listed in credits as dialogue coach] as angry woman
 Tina Louise as Griselda Walden, Buck's wife

References

Further reading
 Tibbetts, John C., and James M. Welsh, eds. The Encyclopedia of Novels Into Film (2nd ed. 2005) pp 156–157.

External links

 
 
 
 

1958 films
1958 drama films
American drama films
American black-and-white films
1950s English-language films
Southern Gothic films
Films based on American novels
Films about farmers
Films set on farms
Films set in Georgia (U.S. state)
Films directed by Anthony Mann
Films scored by Elmer Bernstein
United Artists films
Articles containing video clips
1950s American films